Ségolène Lefebvre (born 30 May 1993) is a French professional boxer who has held the WBO female super-bantamweight title since November 2021.

Professional career
Lefebvre made her professional debut on 24 January 2015, scoring a four-round points decision (PTS) victory against Bojana Libiszewska at the Salle Marie-José Pérec in Fourmies, France.

After compiling a record of 3–0 (0 KOs), she defeated Taoussy L'Hadji via majority decision (MD) to capture the French female super-featherweight title on 22 April 2016 at the Salle Gayant in Douai, France.

Two fights later she defeated Gabriella Mezei via unanimous decision (UD) on 4 November 2016 in Douai, capturing the vacant WBF International female super-bantamweight title. One judge scored the bout 98–92 while the other two scored it 97–93.

In her next fight she challenged for her first world championship, facing Simone Da Silva Duarte for the vacant WBF female super-bantamweight title on 10 March 2017 at the Salle Gayant. After Lefebvre landed a flurry of punches in the ninth round–and with Duarte no longer defending herself–the referee called a halt to the contest, awarding Lefebvre a ninth-round technical knockout (TKO) victory.

She made three successful defences of her title before facing Laura Griffa on 12 April 2019 at the Salle Gayant. With the vacant IBO female super-bantamweight title also on the line, Lefebvre emerged victorious via UD.

Following a successful defence of her WBF title against Ana Maria Lozano in October 2019, Lefebvre defeated Jasmina Nad via UD on 28 May 2021 at the Salle Gayant, capturing the vacant WBC Silver female super-bantamweight title. The judges' scorecards read 100–90, 99–91 and 98–92.

Her next fight came against Paulette Valenzuela on 20 November at the Salle Gayant, with the vacant WBO female super-bantamweight title on the line. Lefebvre was knocked to the floor in the tenth round en route to a UD victory to capture her first major world championship. With the win she was promoted to number three in The Ring magazine's super-bantamweight rankings.

Professional boxing record

References

External links

Living people
1993 births
French women boxers
Super-featherweight boxers
World super-bantamweight boxing champions
World Boxing Organization champions
20th-century French women
21st-century French women